Ghetto Fabolous is the debut studio album by  American rapper Fabolous. The album was released on September 11, 2001 through Desert Storm Records and Elektra Records. The production on the album was handled by DJ Clue, The Neptunes, Rockwilder, Timbaland, Rick Rock and Just Blaze, among others.

Ghetto Fabolous was supported by three singles: "Can't Deny It", Young'n (Holla Back)" and "Trade It All". The album received mixed critical reviews, and was a commercial success. The album debuted at number four on the US Billboard 200 chart, selling 143,000 copies in its first week. The album was certified platinum by the Recording Industry Association of America (RIAA).

Singles
The first single from the album was "Can't Deny It". The single was produced by Rick Rock, and features a chorus by Nate Dogg that alters lyrics from 2Pac's  "Ambitionz Az a Ridah". The single peaked at number 25 on the US Billboard Hot 100. The second single from the album, "Young'n (Holla Back)", which was produced by The Neptunes. The single peaked at number 33. The third single from the album, "Trade It All", featuring vocals from Jagged Edge and produced by DJ Clue and Duro. It reached number 20, becoming the highest-charting single from the album. All three singles had supporting music videos.

Critical reception

Rolling Stone writer Kris Ex noted how the album contained "by-the-numbers danceable bounces" and "predictable thug rhyme themes" throughout the track listing but said that, "Ghetto Fabolous is the most entertaining argument for hip-hop excess to come along in a while, due to Fab's ability to add lyrical twists and turns to the genre." DeMarco Williams of HipHopDX gave praise to Fabolous' "dynamic presence" and "rhyming skills" being reminiscent of Jay-Z and Jadakiss, concluding that "if you can get over the fact that his tracks have no heart, it's well worth a cop." Entertainment Weekly writer Craig Seymour commended Fab's "Mase-like flow" on "Keepin' It Gangsta" and "Can't Deny It" but found it "too one-dimensional" to elevate the rest of the track listing, saying "this hip-hop newcomer doesn't live up to his deliberately misspelled moniker." Steve 'Flash' Juon of RapReviews highlighted the contributions from Timbaland, Rick Rock and DJ Envy as being "energetic and listenable" but felt that Fabolous was "vexing" as an artist for having a dated grab bag of references and DJ Clue lacking quality beats outside of "Trade It All" and "Ride for This", concluding that, "[T]he shame of this album is that by failing to make a huge dent, Fabolous ends up being lumped in with similar rappers like Jadakiss and Ma$e instead of dropping an industry bomb worthy of his star-studded name."

Commercial performance
Ghetto Fabolous debuted at number four on the US Billboard 200 chart, selling 143,000 copies in its first week. This became Fabolous' first US top-ten debut. The album also debuted at number two on the US Top R&B/Hip-Hop Albums chart. On February 3, 2003, the album was certified platinum by the Recording Industry Association of America (RIAA) for shipments of over a million copies in the US. As of March 2003, the album has sold 1.05 million copies in the United States.

Track listing

Charts

Weekly charts

Year-end charts

Certifications

References

2001 debut albums
Fabolous albums
Albums produced by Timbaland
Albums produced by Rick Rock
Albums produced by the Neptunes
Albums produced by Just Blaze
Albums produced by DJ Clue?